Events in the year 1053 in Japan.

Incumbents
Monarch: Go-Reizei

Births
July 7 - Emperor Shirakawa (d. 1129)

References

 
 
Japan
Years of the 11th century in Japan